Sang-e Siah (also Romanized as Sang-e Sīāh) is a village in Miyan Velayat Rural District, in the Central District of Mashhad County, Razavi Khorasan Province, Iran. At the 2006 census, its population was 597, in 140 families.

References 

Populated places in Mashhad County